A tree stack automaton (plural: tree stack automata) is a formalism considered in automata theory. It is a finite state automaton with the additional ability to manipulate a tree-shaped stack. It is an automaton with storage whose storage roughly resembles the configurations of a thread automaton. A restricted class of tree stack automata recognises exactly the languages generated by multiple context-free grammars (or linear context-free rewriting systems).

Definition

Tree stack

  is a partial function from strings of positive integers to the set } with prefix-closed domain (called tree),

  which is true for tree stacks whose stack pointer points to the bottom symbol, and
  which is true for some tree stack  if ,
for every .

  which removes the last symbol from the stack pointer (i.e. it moves the stack pointer to the parent position), and 
for every positive integer  and every .

Tree stack automata
A tree stack automaton is a 6-tuple  where
  (the initial state),
  (whose elements are called transitions), and
  (whose elements are called final states).

  is a state (the current state),
  is a tree stack (the current tree stack), and

A transition  is applicable to a configuration  if
 ,

  such that  assigns for  the symbol  and is undefined otherwise.

Related formalisms
Tree stack automata are equivalent to Turing machines.

A tree stack automaton is called -restricted for some positive natural number  if, during any run of the automaton, any position of the tree stack is accessed at most  times from below.

1-restricted tree stack automata are equivalent to pushdown automata and therefore also to context-free grammars.
-restricted tree stack automata are equivalent to linear context-free rewriting systems and multiple context-free grammars of fan-out at most  (for every positive integer ).

Notes

References

Models of computation
Automata (computation)